This article lists neighborhoods and the nine administrative districts within 50 km of Baghdad, Iraq.

The order is not alphabetical, but is instead arranged according to whether the neighborhood is east or west of the Tigris and then grouped roughly by north–south order. Place names may be affected by differences in translation of Arabic to English. If sourced information on the location was not available, the neighborhood is grouped in the unknown section in alphabetical order. According to a report published by the New York Times on June 3, 2007, there are 457 distinct neighborhoods in Baghdad.

West of the Tigris
 Kadhimiya District
 Al-Kadhimya neighborhood
 Al-Shu'ala
 Utafiyah
 Hurriya City
 Karkh District
 Green Zone
 Mansour district
 Al-Gazaliyah
 Iskan
 Washash
 Al-Adel
 Al-Jami'a
 Al-Khadhraa
 Mansour neighbourhood 
 Al-A'amiriya (Amiriya)
 Yarmouk
 Al Rashid District
  Hayy Al-A'amel (Amel or Amil): Just east of Jihad and west of Bayya’ along Baghdad Airport Road. 
 Al-Baya' (Baiyaa): East of Amil along Baghdad Airport Road. 
 Al-Jihad: Just east of Furat and west of Amil along Baghdad Airport Road, 
 Al-Shurtta (al-Shurta): A "middle- to working-class pocket in the dusty far west of Baghdad"
 Muwasalat and Shurta Al-Khamsa neighborhood, just south of Bayya’
  Swaib
 Al-Saydiya 
 Al-Dora: largest neighborhood in the city
 Al-Jadriyah (Baghdad) 
 Furat: Just east of Baghdad International Airport along Baghdad Airport Road

East of the Tigris

Adhamiyah District
 Sha'ab City
 Shaab-Ur: North of Sadr City
 Hayy Ur
 Al-Wazireya (Waziriyah)
 Adhamiyah neighborhood
 Just outside the Baghdad Wall from Adhamiyah are several smaller neighborhoods
 Dilfiya
 Maghrib
 Kasra
 Qahira
 Sulaikh
 Saba Abkar
 Raghiba Khatoun area of Adhamiya
 Ilaam
 Sadr City
 Rusafa District
 Bab Al-Moatham
 Fadhil: Sunni Arab neighborhood of multistory tenements along the east bank of the Tigris River, the oldest neighborhood in Baghdad
 Sheikh Omar, near Fadhil
 Sadriya
 Shorja: this marketplace, established during the Abbasid period about 750 CE, is the city's oldest
 Bab Al-Sharqi : Mixed area.
 Al-Sa'adoon
 New Baghdad (Baghdad Al-Jadida) or 9 Nissan District
 Zayouna: Mixed neighborhood.
 Karrada (Karradah) District
 Al-Za'franiya:  A semi-rural area on the outskirts of Baghdad squeezed between the Diyala and the Tigris rivers in south-eastern Baghdad.

Unknown
 Khalis, northeast of Baghdad
 Palestine Street, Aqari district,
 Triangle of Death (Iraq)
 Yusufiyah—40 km south of Baghdad
 Mahmoudiyah 40 km south of Baghdad—Known as the “Gateway to Baghdad,”
 Lutifiyah area of southwest Baghdad
 Mashada, 25 miles north of Baghdad
 Risafi—in northwestern Baghdad
 Taji, Iraq is an area approximately 20 miles north of Baghdad, and the site of a large U.S.-controlled military base.
 Kamaliya—in southeastern Baghdad
 Al-Salam, also called Tobchi—in south Al-Hurriya

See also
 Administrative districts in Baghdad

References